The Croods is a 2013 American computer-animated adventure comedy film produced by DreamWorks Animation and distributed by 20th Century Fox. The film was written and directed by Kirk DeMicco and Chris Sanders, and stars the voices of Nicolas Cage, Emma Stone, Ryan Reynolds, Catherine Keener, Clark Duke, and Cloris Leachman. The film is set in a fictional prehistoric Pliocene era known as "The Croodaceous" (a prehistoric period which contains fictional creatures) when Grug, patriarch of the Croods, is threatened by the arrival of a genius named Guy, who comes up with revolutionary new inventions as they trek through a dangerous but exotic land in search of a new home.

The film premiered at the 63rd Berlin International Film Festival on February 15, 2013, and was released in the United States on March 22, 2013. As part of the distribution deal, this was the first DreamWorks Animation film to be distributed by 20th Century Fox, since the end of their distribution deal with Paramount Pictures in 2012. The Croods received generally positive reviews and proved to be a box office success, earning more than $587 million on a budget of $135–175 million. It was nominated for an Academy Award for Best Animated Feature and a Golden Globe Award for Best Animated Feature Film but lost both awards to Walt Disney Animation Studios’ Frozen.

The film launched a new franchise, with a television series, Dawn of the Croods which debuted on December 24, 2015, on Netflix. A sequel directed by Joel Crawford, titled The Croods: A New Age, was released on November 25, 2020.

Plot

A cave family called the Croods survives several natural disasters, due to stubborn patriarch Grug refusing to let anyone leave the cave except for short periods to gather food. Eep, his teenage daughter, loves her family but frequently rebels against Grug's strictures. One night Eep sneaks out when she sees a light, and encounters an inventive modern human boy named Guy and his pet sloth Belt, who have made a torch. He warns her of an impending apocalypse and offers to help her escape, but Eep elects to stay with the family. Guy leaves her a shell horn to blow if she needs help, but when Eep returns to her frantic family, Grug destroys the horn out of fear of the "New".

A massive earthquake destroys the cave and surrounding lands, and the Croods flee into a jungle they discover below their home mountains. Encountering a "Macawnivore", a brightly colored feline whom Eep's grandmother dubs "Chunky", the family flees him, until he is scared off by swarms of "piranhakeets" that devour a ground whale. Eep makes another horn and calls to Guy, who rescues them with his fire. After a great deal of confusion regarding the Croods' first contact with fire, Grug imprisons Guy in a log so he can guide them somewhere safe. To appease Grug, Guy suggests the Croods go to a mountain where there are caves, though in reality he and the other Croods doubt the wisdom of this.

During the journey, Guy is eventually trusted enough to be allowed out of the log. Grug attempts to steal a bird's egg for dinner, but catches a scorpion instead, and Guy teaches Eep how to lay a trap for the bird itself. Guy endears himself to most of the Croods by inventing rudimentary shoes for the family, and other "ideas" which help them along the way. He also tells a story of "Tomorrow", a land of light where curiosity is not to be feared. Grug becomes jealous of Guy, especially when he notices he and Eep are falling in love. His disastrous attempts to fight against change, and to come up with inventions and ideas of his own, distance him from his family and cause his wife Ugga to have a serious discussion with him.

The family finds a cave, but no one but Grug wants to go in, having learned to adapt to living outside. Angered, Grug attacks Guy, but the two fall over a cliff into a tar flow. Guy reveals that he lost his own family to a tar flow, and believes they are doomed. Grug, softened by the story, decides that he and Guy will have to work together to escape. They make a dummy to attract Chunky, who mistakes them for a female cat and pulls them free.

A volcanic cataclysm begins, and Guy and the Croods flee until they are halted at the edge of a chasm where the continents are drifting apart. Grug feels the sun's warmth through the smoke, and realizes that there may be good land on the other side. Grug tosses the others over the chasm one by one, knowing he will be left behind. He shares his latest invention, a "hug" with Eep before throwing her over with the rest of the family. They land, unharmed, on fertile land on the opposite cliff, while Grug shelters alone in a cave.

Grug encounters Chunky, who reveals he is scared of the dark, and seeks comfort with Grug instead of attacking him. Hearing Eep blowing her horn to mourn him, Grug assumes they are calling for his help and comes up with his biggest new idea. He uses tar, fire, a whale ribcage and the pirhanakeets to create a makeshift airship in which he, Chunky, and several other animals escape the final eruption and fly over the chasm to join the others.

Grug is welcomed lovingly back as the leader of the family, and Eep returns his hug. Together with Guy and their new pets, the Croods begin a new life in a tropical mountainside that leads down to the seashore, where they can follow the sun every day and enjoy inventions both Guy and Grug come up with.

Voice cast
 Nicolas Cage as Grug Crood, an overprotective caveman who is Ugga's husband, Gran's son-in-law, and the father of Eep, Thunk, and Sandy.
 Emma Stone as Eep Crood, a teenage cavegirl who is Grug's and Ugga's first daughter, Thunk and Sandy's older sister, and Gran's oldest granddaughter. Eep is the eldest child and is much more willing to try anything new than the rest of her family. She holds romantic feelings towards Guy.
 Ryan Reynolds as Guy, a more evolved teenage caveboy that, with the help of his pet sloth named Belt, thinks of new ideas and inventions that can help themselves or others. He holds romantic feelings towards Eep.
 Catherine Keener as Ugga Crood, a cavewoman who is Grug's wife, the daughter of Gran, and the mother of Eep, Thunk, and Sandy. She is more open-minded than Grug, but also finds it difficult to keep her family safe.
 Clark Duke as Thunk Crood, a caveboy who is Grug's and Ugga's son, Eep and Sandy's brother, and Gran's grandson. Thunk is the middle child and is not bright and has bad coordination, but has a good heart. He gets a crocopup named Douglas for a pet.
 Cloris Leachman as Gran, an old and ferocious cavewoman who is the mother of Ugga, the mother-in-law of Grug, and the grandmother of Eep, Thunk, and Sandy.
 Randy Thom as Sandy Crood, Grug and Ugga's youngest daughter, Eep and Thunk's younger sister, and Gran's youngest granddaughter who still bites and growls instead of speaking. Thom created her voice with creature noises.
 Chris Sanders as Belt, Guy's pet sloth.

Production
The film was announced in May 2005, under the working title Crood Awakening, originally a stop motion film, being made by Aardman Animations, the creators of The Curse of the Were-Rabbit starring Wallace and Gromit, as a part of a "five film deal" with DreamWorks Animation. John Cleese and Kirk DeMicco had been working together on a feature based on Roald Dahl's story The Twits, a project that never went into production.

DreamWorks got a copy of their script and liked it, and invited Cleese and DeMicco over to take a look at the company's ideas to see if they found something they would like to work with. They chose a basic story idea about two cavemen on the run, an inventor and a luddite, and wrote the first few drafts of the script. In January 2007, with the departure of Aardman, the rights for the film reverted to DreamWorks. Aardman, however, continued experimenting with the idea of a Stone Age-themed story into Early Man which would eventually be released in 2018.

In March 2007, Chris Sanders, one of the writers of Mulan and writer/director of Lilo & Stitch, joined DreamWorks to direct the film, with intentions to significantly rewrite the script. In September 2008, it was reported that Sanders took over How to Train Your Dragon putting Crood Awakening on hold, and thus postponing its original schedule for a year to a then planned March 2012. The film's final title, The Croods, was revealed in May 2009, along with new co-director, Kirk DeMicco. In March 2011, the film got another delay, being pushed back a year to March 1, 2013, and finally settled at March 22.

Release

Theatrical
The Croods had its world premiere in the out of competition section at the 63rd Berlin International Film Festival on February 15, 2013. It was released in the United States on March 22, 2013. The film was the first feature film to be shown in the 4DX format, featuring strobe lights, tilting seats, blowing wind and fog and odor effects in Hungary, where it was shown at the Cinema City theater in Budapest, Hungary. It was also the first film in China to be distributed by Oriental DreamWorks, a film production and distribution company founded in 2012 by DreamWorks Animation and Chinese investment companies.

Home media
The Croods was released on Blu-ray (2D and 3D) and DVD on October 1, 2013, by 20th Century Fox Home Entertainment. The DVD and Blu-ray comes with a Belt plush toy. As of February 2015, 9.0 million home entertainment units were sold worldwide. The Croods was released on 4K Blu-Ray on November 17, 2020. It was also released in a 2-movie pack alongside its sequel The Croods: A New Age on DVD and Blu-Ray by Universal Pictures Home Entertainment in the United States and Warner Bros. Home Entertainment in the United Kingdom in 2021.

Reception

Box office
The Croods grossed $187.2 million in the United States and Canada, and $400 million in other countries, for a worldwide total of $587.2 million. Deadline Hollywood calculated the net profit of the film to be $106.5million, when factoring together all expenses and revenues. It is the eleventh highest grossing 2013 film, and the fourth highest grossing 2013 animated film (behind Frozen, Despicable Me 2, and Monsters University). It became the second highest grossing original DreamWorks Animation film, behind Kung Fu Panda. As of January 2014, it is the 89th-highest-grossing film, and the 21st-highest-grossing animated film.

In North America, the film earned $11.6 million on its opening day. On its opening weekend, the film topped the box office with $43.6 million from 4,046 locations, a vast improvement over the DreamWorks Animation's directly preceding release Rise of the Guardians, yet still below some of the studio's other original films, like Megamind and How to Train Your Dragon.

Outside North America, the film topped the box office during its first weekend with $62.4 million (including previews from the previous weekend). It opened at number one in 54 countries, with the biggest openings achieved in the United Kingdom, Ireland and Malta ($8.08 million), Russia and the CIS ($7.82 million), China ($6.34 million), and Mexico ($4.37 million).

In total grosses, the film's biggest market was China with $63.3 million, becoming the highest grossing original animated film, surpassing DreamWorks Animation's film Kung Fu Panda. In addition, the film earned $43.1 million in the United Kingdom, Ireland and Malta, $28.6 million in Russia and the CIS, $27.7 million in Mexico, and $23.8 million in Australia. Earning a total of $400 million, it is the highest grossing 2013 film distributed by 20th Century Fox.

Critical response
On review aggregator Rotten Tomatoes, the film holds an approval rating of 72% based on 144 reviews, with an average score of 6.50/10. The website's critical consensus reads: "While it may not be as (ahem) evolved as the best modern animated fare, The Croods will prove solidly entertaining for families seeking a fast-paced, funny cartoon adventure." On Metacritic, which assigns a normalized rating to reviews, the film has a weighted average score of 55 out of 100, based on 30 critics, indicating "mixed or average reviews". Audiences polled by CinemaScore gave the film an average grade of "A" on an A+ to F scale.

Claudia Puig of USA Today gave the film two and a half stars out of four, saying, "A visually dazzling animated adventure with a well chosen voice cast is hampered by lackluster humor and a meandering story." Tom Russo of The Boston Globe gave the film two and a half out of four, saying, "Had the movie figured out a way to stay the less clichéd course, it might have helped the DreamWorks oeuvre take steps toward Pixar's emotional resonance."

Keith Staskiewicz of Entertainment Weekly gave the film a C+, and wrote in his review, "A handful of adrenalizing sequences of animated anarchy can't save this story from feeling overly primitive." David Rooney of The Hollywood Reporter called the film, "Further back on the evolutionary chain than the Flintstones, and also lagging in the comedy stakes, this sweet Stone Age clan nonetheless will captivate the youngsters." Leslie Felperin of Variety found that, "The main problem with the film is that the script simply isn't very funny, and its various subplots never quite mesh satisfyingly together."

Tirdad Derakhshani of The Philadelphia Inquirer gave the film two and a half stars out of four, saying, "The movie is well edited and lean, a fast paced, action filled bit of froth that manages to be diverting and surprisingly fun." Lisa Kennedy of The Denver Post gave the film three and a half stars out of four, saying "It captures the wonder (and more gently, the anxiety) of discovery time and time again. And the filmmakers have a hoot playing with the Croods' encounters with, as well as their misunderstandings of, all things new." Laremy Legel of Film.com gave the film a B, saying "How to Train Your Dragon and Lilo & Stitch are completely indicative of the experience you'll have with The Croods, which is to say a supremely positive one."

Paul Asay of Plugged In gave the film a positive review, stating "The Croods is, first and foremost, Grug’s story. And it’s one I think an awful lot of fathers might relate to...I should say that there’s very little to fear from this movie. The Croods, for all its slapstick violence, is a fun, mostly clean and utterly charming diversion - something made for kids but meant for their parents. It’s funny. It’s touching. It reminds us that being a parent is tough in any epoch, but always worth the effort."

In August 2021, Australian Prime Minister Scott Morrison compared the plot of the film to the process of easing COVID-19 restrictions. His comments were mocked on social media, with Courtney Fry of Pedestrian.TV noting the film as an odd reference, due to its mixed reception and lack of cultural impact.

Accolades

Soundtrack

Alan Silvestri, who previously worked with co-director Chris Sanders on Lilo & Stitch (2002), composed the film's original score, which was released digitally on March 15, 2013, by Relativity Music Group, and on CD on March 26, 2013, by Sony Classical. The soundtrack also includes "Shine Your Way", an original song performed by Owl City and Yuna.

Video games
A video game based on the film, titled The Croods: Prehistoric Party!, was released on March 19, 2013. Developed by Torus Games, Bandai Namco, and published by D3 Publisher, it was adapted for Wii U, Wii, Nintendo 3DS, and Nintendo DS. The game enables players to take the members of the Croods family on an adventure through 30 party style mini games. It received mainly negative reviews.

A mobile game, titled The Croods, which is a village building game was developed and published by Rovio, the creator of Angry Birds. It was released on March 14, 2013, for the iOS and Android platforms.

Expanded franchise

Sequel

On April 17, 2013, DreamWorks Animation had started developing a sequel to the film, with Sanders and DeMicco set to return as directors. According to DeMicco, the sequel would focus on Ugga and motherhood, making it "the first chapter of society," expanding on the first film, which is about "the last chapter of the caveman."

On September 9, 2013, it had been confirmed that Cage, Stone, and Reynolds would reprise their roles in the sequel. On June 12, 2014, it was announced that the sequel would be released on November 3, 2017. On September 21, 2014, the film's release date was delayed to December 22, 2017. On May 21, 2015, Leslie Mann and Kat Dennings had joined the voice cast. Mann would lend her voice to Hope Betterman, an upscale mother of the rival family, while Dennings would voice her daughter, Dawn. It was also confirmed that Keener and Duke would also reprise their roles. On August 9, 2016, nearing NBCUniversal/Comcast's impending acquisition of DreamWorks Animation, 20th Century Fox removed the film from its release schedule. The film would be instead released by Universal Pictures sometime in 2018. On August 23, 2016, it was announced that The Lego Movie and Hotel Transylvania co-writers Kevin and Dan Hageman will rewrite the script.

On November 11, 2016, DreamWorks announced that production for the sequel was cancelled. According to reports, there had been doubts about proceeding with the project before Universal's acquisition of DreamWorks, and it was DreamWorks' decision to cancel the film. Following this, DeMicco, the co-director of the first film, left DreamWorks to work as director on Vivo for Sony Pictures Animation. On September 19, 2017, DreamWorks and Universal announced that the film was back in production with a release date of September 18, 2020. It was also confirmed that the original actors would reprise their roles. On October 18, 2017, it was announced that Joel Crawford will direct the film, replacing Sanders following his departure from DreamWorks to direct The Call of the Wild for 20th Century Fox, with Mark Swift serving as producer. This marks as Crawford's directorial debut. On October 5, 2018, it was announced that Peter Dinklage had joined the cast to voice Phil Betterman. On April 12, 2019, the film's release date was delayed to December 23, 2020. On October 29, 2019, DreamWorks announced that Kelly Marie Tran had replaced Dennings as Dawn while Mann was still confirmed to be part of the cast.

Production continued remotely during the COVID-19 pandemic with on-site work at the DreamWorks lot suspended.

Television series

A traditionally-animated television series based on the film, titled Dawn of the Croods, debuted on December 24, 2015, on Netflix. None of the original cast members that voiced the Croods family in the film reprise their roles in the series. The voice cast consists of Dan Milano as Grug, Stephanie Lemelin as Eep, Cree Summer as Ugga, A.J. Locascio as Thunk, Laraine Newman as Gran, and Grey Griffin as Sandy.

A second animated series, this time CGI-animated, was announced titled The Croods: Family Tree, set to be released simultaneously on Peacock and Hulu on September 23, 2021. Tran reprises her role as Dawn from the sequel while Locascio reprises his role as Thunk from the previous series. The new voice cast features, Amy Landecker as Ugga, Kiff VandenHeuvel as Grug, Ally Dixon as Eep, Artemis Pebdani as Gran, Darin Brooks as Guy, Matthew Waterson as Phil, and Amy Rosoff as Hope.

In culture
The film was referenced in 2021 by Australian Prime Minister Scott Morrison after his comparison between his government's COVID-19 lockdown exit roadmap strategy and the film, saying "we can't stay in the cave".

Notes

References

External links

 

2013 films
2013 3D films
2013 computer-animated films
2010s American animated films
2010s adventure comedy films
2010s children's comedy films
2010s children's adventure films
20th Century Fox animated films
20th Century Fox films
American adventure comedy films
American children's animated adventure films
American children's animated comedy films
American computer-animated films
American road movies
Animated films about families
Animated films set in prehistory
Annie Award winners
Evolution in popular culture
Films about volcanoes
Films adapted into television shows
Fiction about neanderthals
Prehistoric life in popular culture
DreamWorks Animation animated films
Films scored by Alan Silvestri
Films directed by Chris Sanders
Films with screenplays by John Cleese
Films with screenplays by Chris Sanders
3D animated films
2013 comedy films
Films about cavemen
Animated films about cavemen
The Croods (franchise)
2010s English-language films